Tia Singh  is an Indian actress and model. She won the Asian Super Model title in 2010. She will be making her debut in films through the upcoming  Bollywood movie Pranaam Walekum, in which she plays the role of a mentally challenged girl.

Films

Pranaam Walekum

References

Living people
Actresses from Delhi
Female models from Delhi
Actresses in Hindi cinema
1992 births